Leucopleura is a genus of moths in the subfamily Arctiinae. The genus was erected by George Hampson in 1898.

Species
Leucopleura ciarana Schaus, 1924
Leucopleura cucadma (Druce, 1894)
Leucopleura viridis Gaede, 1926

References

External links

Arctiinae